"Lettre à une femme" is a song by Ninho released in 2020. It has peaked at number-one on the French Singles Chart where he stayed for six weeks.

Charts

Weekly charts

Year-end charts

References

2020 singles
2020 songs
French-language songs
Ninho songs
Number-one singles in France
Ultratop 50 Singles (Wallonia) number-one singles